WWTO-TV, virtual channel 35 (UHF digital channel 32), is a Trinity Broadcasting Network (TBN) owned-and-operated television station serving Chicago, Illinois, United States, that is licensed to Naperville. It is sister to Plano-licensed TBN Inspire owned-and-operated station WLPD-CD (channel 30). The two stations share studios on Vision Court in Aurora and transmitter facilities in Glen Ellyn, near the campus of the College of DuPage.

History

The first station to broadcast on UHF channel 35 licensed to LaSalle went on the air on November 7, 1957 as WEEQ, a satellite station of WEEK-TV in Peoria. WEEK and WEEQ were acquired by a company related to Kerr-McGee, but sold off after Senator Robert S. Kerr's death. The sale, approved by the Federal Communications Commission on July 13, 1966, was for $3,088,650 ($ adjusted for inflation) and transferred the stations to Mid-America Television Co., owned by Kansas City Southern Industries. The station still appeared in the 1973 Broadcasting Yearbook but not the 1974 edition.

Late 1980s
WWTO-TV began broadcasting operations in early December 1986 in Ottawa, It and was licensed to All American Broadcasting Company which was owed and operated by Nicky Cruz and Sonny Arguinzoni.The first Chief Engineer of the TV station was Glen Dingley who also acted as the Station Manager in the first few years of operation. He was responsible for building out the station and placing it on the air. Mr. Dingley then left the station in 1990 to return to his hometown of Houston, Texas.

Until November 13, 2017, WWTO-TV maintained transmitter facilities located in Deer Park Township, LaSalle County (near Starved Rock State Park) and had studios on East Stevenson Road in Ottawa. Though nominally within the Chicago television market, LaSalle is geographically at the far edges of several television markets.

Technical information

Subchannels
This station's digital signal, unlike most other full-service TBN owned-and-operated stations, carries four instead of five different TBN-run networks since it is under a channel sharing agreement.

Translators
Until 2010, WWTO rebroadcast its signal on translators throughout Northern and Central Illinois; however, due to financial strains endured by TBN, these translators closed down in early 2010.

 W19CX in Sterling-Dixon (formerly W52BI; off-air as of March 29, 2010)
 W22AJ in Arlington Heights (formerly W64CQ; off-air as of April 13, 2010)
 W25CL in Rockford (off-air as of March 26, 2010)
 W29BG in Decatur (off-air as of March 25, 2010)
 W34DL in Champaign (off-air as of April 13, 2010)
 W40BY in Chicago (formerly W68DO; now WESV-LD)
 W50DD in Peoria (formerly W41BO; off-air as of March 26, 2010)
 W51CT in Bloomington (off-air as of March 28, 2010)
 W51DT in Galesburg (formerly W50BY; off-air as of April 13, 2010)

W19CX would later be sold to Luken Communications, the parent company of Retro Television Network, under the licensee name "Digital Networks - Midwest".

W22AJ would later be sold to one of the owners of KAXT-CD in San Jose, California, under the licensee name of "Chicago 22, LLC". The callsign was changed to WRJK-LP on January 18, 2013.

W34DL, W51CT and W51DT would later be donated to the Minority Media and Television Council (MMTC); however W34DL and W51CT would later be cancelled, due to inactivity for over one year. The current occupant of channel 34 in Champaign, W34EH-D, is on a new license under a different owner.

W40BY would be purchased by Spanish-language broadcaster Liberman Broadcasting, the parent of Estrella TV in February 2010, giving that network a station in Chicago. The sale was completed on December 6, 2010, with the call letters changed to WESV-LD.

To date, TBN still holds the licenses for W25CL, W29BG and W50DD; however, these translators are among the 36 TBN has sold to Regal Media, a broadcasting group headed by George Cooney, the CEO of the EUE/Screen Gems studios, on April 13, 2012.

Cable carriage
LaSalle lies at the far western end of its nominal Chicago media market. The Federal Communications Commission (FCC) has declared many communities served by Chicago-area cable systems to be outside of WWTO-TV's designated market, and denied must-carry status. In 1997 ruling in favor of Time Warner Cable, the FCC noted that "WWTO-TV has at best a minimal viewing presence in the Chicago ADI as a whole, and the communities are located approximately 65 to 70 miles from WWTO-TV. Furthermore, the station has never been carried on the cable system in question, offers no programming specifically for the relevant communities, and provides no over-the air signal coverage of the Communities." The FCC made a similar ruling in 1999 concerning dozens of cable services in McHenry, DuPage, Lake, Cook, Kane and Will counties in Illinois and Lake, Porter, LaPorte and Jasper counties in Indiana. In that order, the FCC noted that "out of the 10 counties herein, the A.C. Nielsen 1997 County/Coverage Survey does not even list WWTO-TV and for the one where it is listed, Will County, only minimal viewership is recorded." Xfinity sources most of TBN's networks via their national feeds within the Chicago market, outside of must-carry situations where WWTO-DT1's signal must be utilized (WWTO has not asked for must-carry rights regarding its subchannels).

References

External links
Public Files: WWTO — station public file on TBN website

LaSalle County, Illinois
Naperville, Illinois
WTO-TV
Trinity Broadcasting Network affiliates
Television channels and stations established in 1986
1986 establishments in Illinois